Solidago roanensis, the Roan Mountain goldenrod, is a North American species of goldenrod in the family Asteraceae. It is native to the eastern United States, primarily the Appalachian Mountains from Pennsylvania to Georgia, with some populations in the lowlands of South Carolina.

Solidago roanensis is perennial herb up to 100 cm (40 inches) tall with a branching underground caudex. One plant can produce as many as 250 small yellow flower heads in a long, narrow array.

The species is named for Roan Mountain, which straddles the state line between Tennessee and North Carolina. This is where the type specimen was collected.

References

External links
Pennsylvania Natural Heritage Program, Pennsylvania Plant Species of Concern, mountain goldenrod (Solidago roanensis)
Southeastern Flora
All Things Plant, Roan Mountain Goldenrod (Solidago roanensis) in the Goldenrods Database

roanensis
Flora of the Eastern United States
Plants described in 1892